Caroline Rigg (26 August 1852 – 16 December 1929) was a British headmistress. She was the founding head of the Mary Datchelor School.

Life
Rigg was born in Guernsey in 1852. She was the first child of Caroline and Dr James Harrison Rigg. Her father was a Wesleyan minister but in time he led Westminster Training College. Her father was keen for her to follow him into teaching.

Rigg was the founding head of the Mary Datchelor School in 1877 after spending four years leading a Hammersmith board school.

In 1883 she was invited to become a member of the Association of Head Mistresses (AHM) by its founder Frances Buss.

Dorothy Brock was appointed to succeed her as the head of the Mary Datchelor school in 1918.

Rigg died in Brixton in 1929 leaving a bequest to support girls who wanted to go to university.

References

1852 births
1929 deaths
Guernsey people
Founders of English schools and colleges
Women school principals and headteachers
English women educators
19th-century British educators
Heads of schools in England
20th-century British educators